Andre Louis Hicks (July 5, 1970 – November 1, 2004), known by his stage name Mac Dre, was an American rapper from Vallejo, California. He was an instrumental figure in the emergence of hyphy, a cultural movement in the Bay Area hip hop scene that emerged in the early 2000s. Hicks is considered one of the movement's key pioneers that fueled its popularity into mainstream, releasing songs with fast-paced rhymes and basslines that inspired a new style of dance. As the founder of the independent record label Thizz Entertainment, Hicks recorded dozens of albums and gave aspiring rappers an outlet to release albums locally.

On November 1, 2004, Hicks was killed by an unknown assailant after a performance in Kansas City, Missouri, a case that remains unsolved.

Early life and career
Andre Louis Hicks was born in Oakland, California on July 5, 1970, to Allen Hicks and Wanda Salvatto. They then moved to the Vallejo area. He would often frequent the Country Club Crest neighborhood, known locally as The Crest. In 1989, the outgoing Hicks made waves with a cassette tape featuring the single, "Too Hard for the F---in' Radio" while still a student at Vallejo's Hogan High School. In 2013 NPR noted his sound as being "fast and confident" further writing that "he built upon the bouncy bass that had its roots in the funk era." When asked about his childhood, Hicks stated that "Situations came out for the better most of them, I went through the little trials and the shit that I went through." Hicks first adopted the stage name MC Dre in 1984, but altered it to Mac Dre the following year because he considered that the name sounded "too East Coast-ish". Hicks recorded his first three EPs as Mac Dre between 1988 and 1992.

Conviction
The city of Vallejo began experiencing a surge in bank robberies in the early 90s. Vallejo police began focusing on the Crest Neighborhood as a source of the crime. Hicks was vocal about the actions he saw being taken by the police and incorporated their aggressive surveillance of residents into his music. Hicks claimed he was rapping about attempts to "wake up the neighbors." As gangster rap music consistently grew in popularity, law enforcement officials began examining the lyrics of local rappers to utilize as evidence in criminal matters.

On March 26, 1992, at age 21, Hicks was invited by friends to a road trip to Fresno. Hicks had performed in that city two weeks prior and decided to go on the trip so that he could re-visit a woman he knew there. While driving back to Vallejo, the car was surrounded by the FBI, Fresno, and Vallejo police. The police verbalized that while Hicks was at a motel, his friends were allegedly casing a bank but had changed their mind when they saw a local Fresno TV News van in the bank's parking lot.
When questioned by the police, Hicks verbalized that he didn't leave the hotel, therefore did not know anything. The police subsequently charged him with conspiracy to commit robbery, although no bank robbery was conducted and Hicks was neither with his friends nor near the location of the purported bank.
He was sentenced to five years in federal prison after he refused a plea deal for the conspiracy charge. The trial was later listed among Complex Magazine's 30 Biggest Criminal Trials in Rap History. At the time of his conviction, Hicks owned the record label Romp Productions. Hicks was released a year early from prison for good behavior on August 2, 1996, after serving four years. It was during his time in prison that Hicks developed a "better appreciation for freedom, life, fun."

Post-prison career
After his release from Lompoc Prison, Mac Dre and longtime collaborator Coolio Da' Unda Dogg (Troy Reddick) recorded tracks to pitch to major record labels. One song was sent to representatives of fellow Bay Area rapper Too Short for an upcoming compilation, Nationwide: Independence Day, but was not selected.

Mac Dre moved to the Arden-Arcade area of Sacramento in 1998 in attempt to distance himself from Vallejo law enforcement. There, he founded his independent label Thizz Entertainment, which is currently managed by his mother Wanda Salvatto. In the early 2000s, Dre's change in sound became influential in the hyphy movement.

Atlanta rapper and producer Lil Jon, with Salvatto's blessing, incorporated Dre's vocals into his 2019 single "Ain't No Tellin".

Death 
After Hicks and other Thizz Entertainment members had performed a show in Kansas City, Missouri on October 31, 2004, an unidentified gunman shot at the group's van as it traveled on U.S. Route 71 in the early morning hours of November 1. The van's driver crashed and called 911, but Hicks was pronounced dead at the scene from a bullet wound to the neck. Local rapper Anthony "Fat Tone" Watkins was alleged to have been responsible for the murder, but no evidence ever surfaced, and Watkins himself was shot dead the following year.

Hicks' funeral took place on November 9, 2004, at the Mt. Calvary Baptist Church. He was given a public open-casket viewing, and then buried at the Mountain View Cemetery in Oakland.

Discography

Studio albums
Young Black Brotha (1993)
Stupid Doo Doo Dumb (1998)
Rapper Gone Bad (1999)
Heart of a Gangsta, Mind of a Hustla, Tongue of a Pimp (2000)
Mac Dre's the Name (2001)
It's Not What You Say... It's How You Say It (2001)
Thizzelle Washington (2002)
Al Boo Boo (2003)
Ronald Dregan: Dreganomics (2004)
The Genie of the Lamp (2004)
The Game Is Thick, Vol. 2 (2004)

Posthumous studio albums
Pill Clinton (2007)
Dre Day: July 5th 1970 (2008)

Collaboration albums
Supa Sig Tapes with Little Bruce (1990)
Turf Buccaneers with Cutthoat Committee (2001)
Money iz Motive with Cutthoat Committee (2005)
Da U.S. Open with Mac Mall (2005)
A Tale of Two Andres with Andre Nickatina (2008)

See also

 List of murdered hip hop musicians
 List of unsolved murders

References

1970 births
2004 deaths
2004 murders in the United States
African-American male rappers
Burials at Mountain View Cemetery (Oakland, California)
Deaths by firearm in Missouri
Gangsta rappers
G-funk artists
Male murder victims
Murdered African-American people
Musicians from Vallejo, California
People murdered in Missouri
Rappers from Oakland, California
Rappers from the San Francisco Bay Area
Underground rappers
Unsolved murders in the United States
West Coast hip hop musicians
20th-century American male musicians
20th-century African-American musicians
21st-century African-American people